Free Agents: The Murda Mixtape is a double mixtape album by American hardcore/East Coast hip hop duo Mobb Deep. It was released on April 22, 2003 through Landspeed Records with distribution via Koch Entertainment. 

The first disc is composed of 22 tracks, and featured production from Havoc, S.C. and Alchemist with Robert Perry and Mobb Deep serving as executive producers. Recording sessions took place at Fly Studios. Tracks from 17 to 22 are classic freestyles mixed by DJ Whoo Kid. A. Dog from ACD and Big Noyd were the only guests on the disc one. 

The bonus disc is composed of 19 tracks, and featured production from Havoc, Alchemist, Godfather Don, V.I.C., Bink!, Ghetto Pros. and DJ Whoo Kid. Recording sessions took place at Soundtrack Studio, at the Lab, at D&D Studios and at Chung King Studios in New York, at Soundproof in California, and at C Mo' Greens Studio. 1st Infantry, 50 Cent, Blaq Poet, Cormega, Evidence, Infamous Mobb, Kool G Rap, Littles, Tragedy Khadafi, Noyd and Godfather Don were featured on the bonus disc.

The album peaked at number 21 on the Billboard 200.

Track listing

Charts

References

External links 

Mobb Deep albums
2003 mixtape albums
Albums produced by Godfather Don
Albums produced by Havoc (musician)
Albums produced by Bink (record producer)
Albums produced by the Alchemist (musician)